A mogote is a generally-isolated steep-sided residual hill in the tropics composed of either limestone, marble, or dolomite. Mogotes are surrounded by nearly flat alluvial plains. The hills typically have a rounded, tower-like form.

Overview
This term is used for hills, isolated or linked, with very steep, almost vertical, walls, surrounded by alluvial plains in the tropics, regardless of whether the carbonate strata in which they have formed are folded or not.

Mogotes are common in the karst areas of the Caribbean, especially in Cuba and Puerto Rico. Los Haitises National Park in the Dominican Republic is another karst area that contains mogotes.

The word mogote comes from the Basque word 'mokoti' meaning "sharp-pointed" ('moko' meaning "mountain peak"). In Puerto Rico, several mogotes along a ridge are called pepinos.

Gallery

See also 

 Northern Karst of Puerto Rico
 Viñales Valley
 South China Karst

References

Further reading
 

Inselbergs
Landforms of Cuba
Erosion landforms
Karst